The Lycée français Jules Verne ( is a French international school in Fraijanes, Guatemala. It serves levels maternelle (preschool) to lycée (senior high school).

See also

 French Guatemalan

References

External links
 Lycée français Jules Verne 

International schools in Guatemala
Education in Guatemala City
Guatemala